Sclerolaena muricata, commonly known as black rolypoly, is a perennial shrub native to eastern and central Australia.

References

muricata
Caryophyllales of Australia